Samuel Beníquez Méndez (born October 28, 1971), is a Puerto Rican  businessman, musician, composer, producer, communication strategist and author of several books such as: "Tu alto precio... Mi Gran Valor"  and “El Niño Versus la Bestia”.

Personal life
Beníquez was born at Doctors' Center Hospital in Santurce, San Juan, Puerto Rico. His biological mother is Antonia Beníquez Seguí. He was adopted by his maternal uncle and aunt, Félix Beníquez Quiñones and Ada Méndez Castro, on February 21, 1973.

However, Samuel Beníquez's biological mother, Antonia Beníquez Seguí, remained in the Beníquez–Méndez family home, taking care of her son as if she were his nanny. Beníquez Méndez grew up believing this lie and was indoctrinated in the Congregación Mita religion, which was founded in Puerto Rico and is now established in several parts of the world.

Beníquez Méndez has studied music since age six and excels on instruments such as the clarinet, flute, and saxophone. He was a member of Mita Congregation's wind band until 1995 and received a scholarship to study music at the University of Puerto Rico, Río Piedras campus.

About thirty years later, on May 13, 2003, Beníquez Méndez and his mother, Beníquez Seguí, filed a motion before the Court of First Instance to nullify the adoption. They largely argued that Beníquez Seguí was coerced and intimidated by the Beníquez–Méndez couple to consent to the adoption of her son. Consequently, they alleged that her consent was unlawful, which rendered the resolution issued February 21, 1973, null and void. Unlawful consent deprives the Court of jurisdiction, making the resolution issued nonexistent.

The petitioners also argued that Beníquez Méndez was raised by his mother from birth and even moved with her at the age of six to live at a residence other than that of his aunt and uncle. Furthermore, they added that the Beníquez–Méndez couple only sought to adopt the minor in order to financially profit off a child they supposedly never raised.

On September 13, 2003, the Court of First Instance overruled the petitioners’ motion with an unsubstantiated resolution. This decision was never appealed or revised, becoming final and enforceable.

Later, on November 4, 2004, Beníquez Seguí and Beníquez Méndez filed a second claim regarding nullity of adoption procedures and declaration of filiation in which the petitioners alleged that Beníquez Seguí, when she was still pregnant with Beníquez Méndez, was coerced, threatened, and subjected to “mental, moral, emotional, and religious pressures” to give her consent for the Beníquez-Méndez couple to adopt her son.

Separately from what they alleged in their first motion, the petitioners also argued that the pattern of coercion and intimidation in question was because Mr. Teófilo Vargas Seín, spiritual leader of the Mita Congregation religion, was the biological father of Beníquez Méndez and that the aunt and uncle – together with other people from the congregation – orchestrated the adoption in question in order to hide that fact. In agreement with the above, they requested that the adoption under examination be ruled null and that the Demographic Registrar be ordered to register Beníquez Méndez as the biological son of Beníquez Seguí and Vargas Seín.

The legal case spent nearly 10 years in court and even reached the Puerto Rico Supreme Court, concluding in a resolution by the Supreme Court ordering that the proceedings of the case be continued and that Teófilo Vargas Seín, better known as Aarón, forcibly recognize the filiation, thus granting Samuel Beníquez Méndez the right to know his true paternal filiation.

As such, Aarón was officially summoned to appear at the Histocompatibility Institute of the Medical Sciences Campus of the University of Puerto Rico on March 11, 2013, at 8:00 a.m. to take a DNA test together with Samuel Beníquez Méndez and Antonia Beníquez Seguí.

The parties, including Samuel Beníquez Méndez, his vilified mother, Antonia Beníquez Seguí, and the lawyer who had brought the paternity suit for 10 years, Nicolás Nogueras, were summoned to the Court of San Juan to hear the reading of the DNA test on March 25, 2013, by Judge Arlene Sellés Guerrini.

The laboratory results reflected a 99.99% probability that Aarón is Samuel Beníquez Méndez's biological father. Beníquez Méndez, at the age of 41 years, celebrated that he had a father, named Aarón, and that his mother was vindicated.

However, Teófilo Vargas Seín, the top leader of the Mita Congregation, “left” the case and to this day, has never wanted to establish a relationship of friendship, love, spirituality, or fatherhood with his biological son, Samuel.

Businesses

Samuel Beníquez Méndez, CEO of AVFA, got his start by working at a computer center at a very young age. Beníquez Méndez was 16 years old and still in high school when he began working as a data processor at the Government of Puerto Rico's General Services Administration's Computer Center, the only teenager hired at that time and on a night shift. At age 18, following the example set by his father, he began working at the Hermanos Unidos Savings and Credit Cooperative in Hato Rey, San Jose, Puerto Rico.

He held a number of positions in that line of work within the organization until he decided to work independently as an insurance and investment agent with the company Primerica Financial Services (formerly part of Citigroup), becoming a regional vice president while he attended the Interamerican University of Puerto Rico, where he received his Bachelor's in Business Administration with a Concentration in Marketing. Meanwhile, he learned a lot about insurance and investments surrounded by qualified people with extensive knowledge in the field.

Beníquez Méndez had always intended to build a career and after succeeding, start his own company. He therefore founded the financial institution First Home Financial with his brother Samuel Ortiz in 1995, which has locations in several towns in Puerto Rico and the US state of Pennsylvania. He held the position of CEO of the bank and Chairman of the Board of Directors of the corporation. Following this, he was the CEO of successful companies such as ER Remodeling & Construction Co., Imperial Music Studio, Imperial College, Black Dot Records, BD Authors, Imperial Recording Studios, and Imperial Artists, among others, while he continued his studies at SMC University, where among other obtained degrees, he graduated from a mini MBA in Business Hacker; a very important degree for him, because he has always been involved in everything related to technology, innovation and information systems. As founder of these companies, in addition to administration, he was also directly involved in marketing and media relations.

His exciting career in the corporate world since he was young has provided him with important experiences in administration, marketing, communications, and the responsibility of being in charge of the losses and earnings of different companies.

His experience in fields such as technology, innovation and academia took him, approximately from 2013 to 2017, to be part (along with the icons of the industry in Puerto Rico) of the Videogame Cluster of the government agency "Puerto Rico Industrial Development Company (PRIDCO)", of the Commonwealth of Puerto Rico. This cluster was commissioned by this period to promote the Puerto Rico video game industry internationally with a plan that bet on talent and the strengthening of the competitiveness of companies and the academy of said archipelago.

Today, Beníquez Méndez is the CEO of AVFA Group, a company with offices in Puerto Rico, the Caribbean, and the continental United States. The company offers public relations services, strategic communications, copywriting, media services, interactive services, and business advice to all types of companies.

Since taking the reins of the company, Beníquez Méndez has worked to expand and position it for success in the 21st century, focusing on growth and new business areas. Its portfolio focuses on protecting the company from taking too many risks while maximizing its opportunities for growth.

Just like how he learned when he was young, Beníquez Méndez has surrounded himself with talented and knowledgeable people. Additionally, he has simplified the organization and promotes a team approach to solving problems and determining a long-term strategic direction. Beníquez Méndez has also given employees a system of policies and values and encouraged them to live the company's mission and vision, where professionalism and excellent service are the most important.

In 2018 Samuel founded the multiplatform newspaper Tribunal del Pueblo which has the exclusivity of the Borikwood section to inform about the film and music industry of Puerto Rico.

Music and Writing

Beníquez Méndez is the cowriter and composer (with Samuel Ortiz) of songs such as "Histeria," "Dame de ti," "Inevitable," "Todo fue por," and "Si a ti te gusta," as well as another 24 sets of lyrics and musical pieces. Also in collaboration with Samuel Ortiz, he produced the albums Histeriha and Off Da’ Hook, winning the Paoli Award for Best New Artist in 2002. In 2005, the songs off his album Off Da' Hook were again distributed on the world market under the label Critique, this time on the album Viper Boyz, sharing credits with artists as big as Lil Jon & the East Side Boyz, D-Roc, DJ Smurf, Kaine, Los TNT, and Ludacris.

Their achievements led to them becoming voting members of the Recording Academy and the Latin Recording Academy, and in 2012, he received a recognition reading “In acknowledgment and recognition of 10 years of membership, and for supporting the Recording Academy’s mission of improving the climate for music and the lives of all the members of our creative community.” The recognition was signed by the Chairman of the Board of Trustees, George Flanigen IV, and the president/CEO, Neil Portnow.

Additionally, under the pseudonym Miguel Amadeus, he wrote the bestselling book Tu alto precio ... Mi gran valor in 2004, and in 2015, he wrote and published his most recent book, El niño versus la bestia, which was displayed on the big screens in Times Square in New York.

Awards

On June 25, 2011: Samuel Beníquez and his firm received the award for business excellence “THE BIZZ 2011″, the recognition of “Inspirational Company” and the honorary title of “World Business Leader”. Also, Samuel Beniquez won the honorary title of "World Leader Businessperson", "Excellence in Business Leadership" and "Excellence in Quality Management".

On November, 2011: Beníquez and his firm won the acclaimed Platinum Statuette at the MarCom Awards for the outstanding and successful social media campaign which it created for Atlantic University College (http://facebook.com/AtlanticUniversity), which is incidentally recognized as the leading university for digital arts in the Caribbean.

On June 10, 2012: Beníquez and his firm AVFA received the award for business excellence “The Peak of Success 2012″ and the recognition of “Inspirational Company”, awarded by WORLDCOB (World Confederation of Businesses). In addition, the firm earned for second year the honorary title of “World Business Leader”. Also, for the second consecutive year, Samuel Beniquez won the honorary title of "World Leader Businessperson", "Excellence in Business Leadership" and "Excellence in Quality Management".

On October 17, 2012: Samuel Beniquez and Samuel Ortiz, from AVFA, were nominated for an Emmy® Award for the category “COMMUNITY / PUBLIC SERVICE (PSAs),” for public service commercial that produced entitled: Date Cuenta... Orientate Deten el Bullying!

On November 2012: Samuel and his firm won two MarCom Awards for public service campaign marketing/public relations/communications entitled "Date Cuenta... ¡Oriéntate! Detén el "Bullying", and another, for the social media campaign prepared for Atlantic University College institution.

In 2015, Beniquez and AVFA, received the award for business excellence "Beyond Success 2015" and recognition of "Inspirational Enterprise" awarded from WORLDCOB (World Confederation of Businesses). The company also won the honorary title of "World Business Leader". Also, Samuel Beníquez won the honorary title of "World Business Leader", "Excellence in Business Leadership" and "Excellence in Quality Management".

See also 
 List of Puerto Ricans

References

External links
 Samuel Beniquez Official Website

Puerto Rican businesspeople
Puerto Rican composers
Puerto Rican male composers
Puerto Rican musicians
Puerto Rican writers
1971 births
People from San Juan, Puerto Rico
Living people
21st-century Puerto Rican writers
21st-century Puerto Rican musicians
21st-century American male musicians